The 15th Annual British Academy Television Craft Awards were presented by the British Academy of Film and Television Arts (BAFTA) on 24 April 2014, with Stephen Mangan presiding over the event. The awards were held at The Brewery, City of London, and given in recognition of technical achievements in British television of 2013.

Winners and nominees
Winners are listed first and highlighted in boldface; the nominees are listed below.
{| class="wikitable"
|-
! style="background:#BDB76B; width:50%" |  Best Breakthrough Talent
! style="background:#BDB76B; width:50%" |  Best Director - Fiction/Entertainment
|-
| valign="top" |
 Daniel Fajemisin-Duncan, Marlon Smith – Run
 Nancy Harris – Dates
 Dan Smith – David Attenborough’s Natural History Museum Alive 3D
 Sam Leifer, Teddy Leifer – Plebs
| valign="top" |
 Otto Bathurst – Peaky Blinders
 James Strong – Broadchurch (for "Episode One")
 Jane Campion, Garth Davis – Top of the Lake
 Marc Munden – Utopia
|-
! style="background:#BDB76B; width:50%" |  Best Director - Factual
! style="background:#BDB76B; width:50%" |  Best Director - Multi-Camera
|-
| valign="top" |
 Nick Holt – The Murder Trial
 David Brindley, Grace Reynolds – Educating Yorkshire
 Lee Phillips – Her Majesty's Prison Aylesbury
 Sara Hardy, Blue Ryan – The Unspeakable Crime: Rape
| valign="top" |
 Phil Heyes – The X Factor
 Bridget Caldwell – The Funeral of Baroness Thatcher 
 Steve Smith – The Graham Norton Show
 Nikki Parsons – Strictly Come Dancing
|-
! style="background:#BDB76B; width:50%" |  Best Writer - Comedy
! style="background:#BDB76B; width:50%" |  Best Writer - Drama
|-
| valign="top" |
 The IT Crowd – Graham Linehan
 Count Arthur Strong – Steve Delaney, Graham Linehan
 Fresh Meat – Sam Bain, Jesse Armstrong, Tom Basden
 The Wrong Mans – James Corden, Mathew Baynton
| valign="top" |
 Dominic Mitchell – In the Flesh 
 Chris Chibnall – Broadchurch  
 Sally Wainwright – Last Tango in Halifax  
 Dennis Kelly – Utopia 
|-
! style="background:#BDB76B; width:50%" |  Best Make Up and Hair Design
! style="background:#BDB76B; width:50%" |  Best Production Design
|-
| valign="top" |
 An Adventure in Space and Time – Vickie Lang
 Burton and Taylor – Lucy Cain
 Da Vinci's Demons – Jacqueline Fowler
 Death Comes to Pemberley – Loz Schiavo
| valign="top" |
 Ripper Street – Mark Geraghty
 Broadchurch – Catrin Meredydd
 Burton and Taylor – John Stevenson
 Peaky Blinders – Grant Montgomery
|-
! style="background:#BDB76B;"|  Best Original Television Music
! style="background:#BDB76B;"|  Best Costume Design
|-
| valign="top" |
 Broadchurch – Ólafur Arnalds
 Luther – Paul Englishby
 Peaky Blinders – Martin Phipps
 Top of the Lake – Mark Bradshaw
| valign="top" |
 Downton Abbey – Caroline McCall
 An Adventure in Space and Time – Suzanne Cave
 Da Vinci's Demons – Annie Symons
 The Suspicions of Mr Whicher: The Murder in Angel Lane – Lucinda Wright
|-
! style="background:#BDB76B;"|  Best Photography – Factual
! style="background:#BDB76B;"|  Best Photography and Lighting – Fiction
|-
| valign="top" |
 Rebuilding the World Trade Center – Marcus Robinson
 Africa (for "Congo") – Camera Team
 Mechanical Marvels: Clockwork Dreams – Andy Jackson
 Syria: Across the Lines – Olly Lambert
| valign="top" |
 Peaky Blinders – George Steel
 Dancing on the Edge – Ashley Rowe
 Luther – John Conroy
 Utopia – Ole Birkeland
|-
! style="background:#BDB76B; width:50%" |  Best Editing – Factual
! style="background:#BDB76B; width:50%" |  Best Editing – Fiction
|-
| valign="top" |
 Educating Yorkshire (for "Episode One") – Mark Towns Arena: The National Theatre (for "Part One - The Dream") – Joanna Crickmay
 David Bowie – Five Years – Ged Murphy
 Top Gear – Craig Harbour, James Hart, Dan James
| valign="top" |
 The Fall – Steve Singleton
 An Adventure in Space and Time – Philip Kloss
 Broadchurch (for "Episode Eight") – Mike Jones
 Top of the Lake (for "Episode Six") – Alexandre de Franceschi
|-
! style="background:#BDB76B;"|  Best Digital Creativity
! style="background:#BDB76B;"|  Best Entertainment Craft Team
|-
| valign="top" |
 D-Day: As It Happens – Production Team
 CBeebies Playtime – Jon Howard, Leanne Dougan, Lizzie Leadbeater, Richard Wilson
 This Morning: Take Over the Makeover – Production Team
 Utopia – TH_NK
| valign="top" |
 Ant & Dec's Saturday Night Takeaway – Patrick Doherty, Kevin Duff, Kim Gavin, Andrew Milligan
 Doctor Who at the Proms 2013 – Bernie Davis, Eryl Ellis, Huw Thomas, Keith Ware
 Dynamo: Magician Impossible – Alex Hartman, Saul Gittens, Dan Evans, Amer Iqbal
 Top Gear – James Hart, Dan James, Andy Hodges
|-
! style="background:#BDB76B;"|  Best Sound – Factual
! style="background:#BDB76B;"|  Best Sound – Fiction
|-
| valign="top" |
 David Bowie – Five Years – Rowan Jennings, Karl Mainzer, Adam Scourfield
 Africa (for "Kalahari") – Kate Hopkins, Tim Owens, Graham Wild
 Britten's Endgame – Patrick Boland, Mike Hatch, Rowan Jennings, Paul Paragon
 David Attenborough’s Natural History Museum Alive 3D – Freddie Claire, Graham Kirkman, John Rogerson, Richard Addis
 Hebrides – Islands on the Edge – Ben Peace, Kate Hopkins, Tim Owens
| valign="top" |
 Dancing on the Edge – Adrian Bell, Lee Crichlow, Robert Farr, Ian Wilkinson
 The Escape Artist – Chris Ashworth, Graham Headicar, Stuart Hilliker, Duncan Price
 Luther – Howard Bargroff, Russell Jeffery, Mike Grimes, Emma Pegram
 Peaky Blinders – Stuart Hilliker, Brian Milliken, Matthew Skelding, Lee Walpole
|-
! colspan="2" style="background:#BDB76B;" |  Best Special, Visual and Graphic Effects
|-
|colspan=2 valign="top" |
 Doctor Who (for "The Day of The Doctor") – Milk VFX, Real SFX, The Model Unit David Attenborough’s Natural History Museum Alive 3D – Zoo, Fido, Colossus
 Micro Monsters with David Attenborough: Predator – Hollingworth Photography, British Technical Films, Colossus
 Peaky Blinders – BlueBolt (VFX), Rushes (Colourist)
|-
|}

Special Award
 Strictly Come Dancing

See also
2014 British Academy Television Awards

References

External links
British Academy Craft Awards official website

2013 television awards
2014 in British television
2014 in London
April 2014 events in the United Kingdom
2013